Bye-Bye Borderline is the sixth studio album by Norwegian industrial rock band Zeromancer. It was released on 25 January 2013.

Track listing
 Auf Wiedersehen Boy (3:30)
 Bye-Bye Borderline (4:19)
 LCYD (4:07)
 You Meet People Twice (3:42)
 Manoeuvres (3:45)
 Weakness (3:46)
 Lace and Armour (3:09)
 Montreal (5:12)
 Ash Wednesday (4:44)
 The Tortured Artist (4:18)

Personnel

Alex Møklebust - vocals
Kim Ljung - bass
Noralf Ronthi - drums
Dan Heide - guitar
Lorry Kristiansen - keyboards, programming

Release details

Special Russian edition of this album was released in Russia via Irond Records label. This version has received an alternative cover-art. "Our Russian fans are amongst our most dedicated. Now we are extremely happy to announce that we are back with IronD records and releasing Bye-Bye Borderline in Russia. Like with our other releases the cover will have another look." - the band wrote on their official website.

References

2013 albums
Zeromancer albums